The Central Asian Union (CAU), later called the Central Asian Economic Union, was an intergovernmental organisation for economic integration between the Central Asian post-Soviet republics of Kazakhstan, Kyrgyzstan and Uzbekistan between 1994 and 2004. Tajikistan joined the Union in 1996 as an observer. Several proposals to restore the Union have been put forward since its dissolution.

History

The old union 
The concept of a Central Asian union emerged soon after the dissolution of the Soviet Union in 1991. Although all states acceded to the newly formed Commonwealth of Independent States (CIS), it was felt that more regional cooperation was needed. In early 1992, Tajikistan plunged into the Tajikistani Civil War (1992–1997) between government forces and various Islamist rebel factions supported by the Taliban; thus they could not participate in the integration process. Turkmenistan preferred to maintain neutrality, and decided not to partake in CIS or Central Asian integration.

The remaining three republics Kazakhstan, Kyrgyzstan and Uzbekistan signed a treaty on 23 September 1993 to create an economic union, which was followed by a proclamation of a "single economic space" on 10 February 1994, and the establishment of an Interstate Council with an Executive Committee on 8 July 1994. In theory, any CIS member state could join the Central Asian Union.

The Union was also given a military dimension. Still in civil war, Tajikistan joined the CAU as an observer in 1996. A Council of Defence Ministers was formed, and, under the aegis of the United Nations, a peacekeeping force was formed, which held its first training exercises on the territory of Kazakhstan and Uzbekistan in September 1997.

A new union 
A new Central Asian Union was proposed by Kazakhstan President Nursultan Nazarbayev on April 26, 2007, in order to create an economic and political union similar to that of the EU encompassing the five former Soviet Central Asian republics of Kazakhstan, Kyrgyzstan, Tajikistan, Turkmenistan and Uzbekistan.

So far the presidents of Kazakhstan and Kyrgyzstan have signed an agreement to create an "International Supreme Council" between the two states. In addition, Kazakhstan, Uzbekistan and Kyrgyzstan have signed a Treaty of Eternal Friendship. Kazakhstan and Uzbekistan have also decided to set up a free trade zone.

Although the proposed new union had the support of the presidents of Kazakhstan, Kyrgyzstan and Tajikistan by 2008, it was outright rejected by former Uzbek president Islam Karimov. After Karimov died in 2016, however, the idea of integration was brought back on the table.

On 15 March 2018, a new Central Asian Summit was held in Astana between Kazakh President Nursultan Nazarbaev (host), Uzbek President Shavkat Mirziyoyev (initiator), Kyrgyz President Sooronbai Jeenbekov, Tajik President Emomali Rahmon, and Turkmen parliament speaker Akja Nurberdiýewa. The Kazakh President Nursultan Nazarbayev hosted the summit at the Aqorda Presidential Palace. It was the first summit of Central Asian leaders in nearly a decade. They resolved to henceforth convene every year in March before the Nowruz (New Year) holiday.

A second summit was held on 29 November 2019 in Astana.

Prospective members

List of Central Asian leader summits 
 Ashgabat (1991)
 Tashkent (1993)
 Dashoguz (1995)
 Ashgabat (1998)
 Ashgabat (1999)
 Almaty (2009)
 Astana (2018)
 Tashkent (2019)

Issues
The proposed Union would primarily deal with interstate border issues, trade, visa regimes, tourism and security. If realized, the CAU would represent a counterbalance to the existing Russian-dominated Collective Security Organization and the Chinese-Russian-led Shanghai Cooperation Organisation. In his proposal, the Kazakh President said: "In the region, we share economic interest, cultural heritage, language, religion, and environmental challenges, and face common external threats. The founding fathers of the European Union could only wish they had so much in common. We should direct our efforts towards closer economic integration, a common market and a single currency."

See also

References

External links
Tengri on Mars

Post-Soviet alliances
Central Asia
Continental unions
Proposed international organizations
International organizations based in Asia
Kazakhstan–Kyrgyzstan relations
Free trade agreements
Economy of Kazakhstan
Kazakhstan–Uzbekistan relations
Economy of Uzbekistan